Nathi Bari Tarzan is a 2019 Sri Lankan Sinhala comedy film directed by Sudesh Wasantha Pieris and produced by Athila Wickramsooriya for Triple A Creations. It is the third installment of Weda Beri Tarzan franchise, and sequel to 2008 film Wada Bari Tarzan Mathisabayata. Tennyson Cooray reprise his role as Tarzan and Menaka Maduwanthi in lead roles along with Rajitha Hiran and Isuru Lokuhettiarachchi. Music composed by Keshan Perera. It is the 1323rd Sri Lankan film in the Sinhala cinema.

Plot
Tarzan's (Tennyson) life in the city was bitter. Thousands of times he wondered how good his life was. Therefore, Tarzan move back to the jungle. Merzon (Rajitha) is Tarzan's best friend. Meanwhile, Isuru (Isuru) and his treasure hunters enter the jungle and are currently digging the jungle and looking for treasure. They want a firstborn girl. It is in the meantime that many boys and girls including Vindya (Menaka) come to the forest. While they are having fun, Vindya accidentally meets Tarzan. Knowing that she is a first-born girl, Tarzan was determined to protect her from treasure hunters.

Cast
 Tennyson Cooray as Tarzan
 Menaka Maduwanthi as Vindya
 Rajitha Hiran as Merzon
 Isuru Lokuhettiarachchi as Isuru
 Manjula Moragaha
 Dilki Mihiraji
 Lakshman Amarasekara  
 Mahinda Ihalagamage as Dagara	
 Hemantha Iriyagama as Bullet	
 Don Leela		
 Sarath Samarawickrama

References

External links
 
 Nathi Bari Tarzan on YouTube

2019 films
2010s Sinhala-language films